Abdul Azeez Madani (9 April 1950 – 14 July 2022) was an Indian Islamic scholar and writer from Kerala and one of the leaders of traditional Sunni Muslims in India. He died in Badriyya Manzil and was buried in Madani Ustad Maqam (Madani Dargah) at Kunnamangalam.

Early life 
Abdul was born to Umar Molla and Fatima in Thalassery, Kannur district, Kerala. He started his studies under his father. After the primary studies from home, he went to the Sayyid Madani Arabic College, Ullal, Karnataka. Following his graduation, Abdul returned to his native home and carried on in the educational field for years. He was the second rank holder in Madani graduation.

Books 
 Muslim names

Awards 
 Makhdoomi Award

See also 
 Sayyid Muhammad Jifri Muthukkoya Thangal
 Sheikh Abubakr Ahmad
 Sayyid Ibraheem Khaleel Al Bukhari
 Prof. Ali Kutty Musliyar

References

External links 
 Markazu Saqafathi Sunniyya

1950 births
2022 deaths
Indian Muslims
20th-century Muslim scholars of Islam
Sunni Muslim scholars of Islam
Muslim reformers
Shafi'i fiqh scholars
People from Thalassery